Noël Deerr (1874 – 1953) was an English historian and technologist of the sugar industry. His major work was The History of Sugar, published in two volumes by Chapman and Hall in London, 1949–1950.

A Noël Deerr Gold Medal is awarded by The Sugar Technologists' Association of India in Deerr's memory.

Selected publications
 Sugar House Notes and Tables: a Reference Book for Planters, Factory Managers, Chemists, Engineers, and Others Employed in The Manufacture of Cane Sugar. London: E. & F. N. Spon, 1900.
 Sugar and the Sugar Cane: an elementary treatise on the agriculture of the sugar cane and on the manufacture of cane sugar. Altrincham: Norman Rodger, 1905.
 Cane Sugar: a Textbook on the Agriculture of the Sugar Cane, The Manufacture of Cane Sugar, And The Analysis of Sugar-house Products. 2nd edition. London: Norman Rodger, 1921.
 "The Reduction of Sugar Factory Results to a Common Basis of Comparison", I.S.J., 35 (1933), p. 214.
 Methods of Chemical Control for Cane Sugar Factories and Gur Refineries. Cawnpore: Sugar Technologists' Association of India, 1936.
 The History of Sugar. London: Chapman and Hall, 1949–1950.
 Payne, John Howard (compiler) Noël Deerr: Classic Papers of a Sugar Cane Technologist. Amsterdam & Oxford: Elsevier, 1983.

References

Further reading
 Bechard, R. M. "Natal Sugar Mill Results Examined in the Light of the Noel Deerr Formulae".

External links 

1874 births
1953 deaths
Sugar industry in the United Kingdom
English historians
Sugar technologists